Pier Maria Pennacchi (1464 – before 1515) was an Italian Renaissance painter primarily active in Treviso. His one documented work is a fresco of Christ for a chapel in the Treviso cathedral. In Venice, the ceiling of the church of Santa Maria dei Miracoli is often attributed to him, as are the Annunciation frescoes in San Francesco della Vigna and a Madonna which came to be placed in the sacristy of the church of Santa Maria della Salute. One of his pupils was Girolamo da Treviso.

References

Scirè, Giovanna Nepi. "Pennacchi, Pier Maria" Grove Art Online. Oxford University Press, [accessed 8 July 2007].

1464 births
16th-century deaths
15th-century Italian painters
Italian male painters
16th-century Italian painters
Painters from Venice
Italian Renaissance painters